Keogh is an Irish surname. 

Keogh may also refer to:

Fort Keogh, a U.S. Department of Agriculture livestock and range research station
Keogh plan, a type of pension plan for self-employed people in the U.S.

See also 

Kehoe (disambiguation)
Keoghan (surname)
Keohane (disambiguation)
Keough (disambiguation)
McKeogh
McKeough (disambiguation)